Joyland is a Pakistani amusement park company based in Lahore, Punjab, Pakistan.

The park, adjacent to Fortress Stadium, was established in 1977 and is one of the largest recreation parks in the city.

References

External links
 Joyland - Official website

Amusement parks in Lahore
Lahore Cantonment
Companies based in Lahore